Nso (Lamnso, Lamnsɔ’) is the Grassfields language of the Nso people of western Cameroon. A few may remain in Nigeria. It has ten major noun classes. The ISO 639-3 code is lns. Nso is spoken by over 100,000 people.

Writing System
Nso uses an orthography based on the General Alphabet of Cameroon Languages (AGLC). An orthography had initially been created before being modified to follow the recommendations of the AGLC.

Nso uses 23 digraphs  et 7 trigraphs . Long vowels are indicating by doubling the vowel . Diphthongs are noted .

The high tone is indicated with the acute accent and the low tone with the grave accent on the vowel.

Phrases

  Thank you.
  You are welcome.
  What news? (Greeting).
  No news (Reply) or  I am fine.
  Good morning.
   How did you sleep?
  Good afternoon.
  Good evening.
  Sleep well.
  Good bye until tomorrow.
  Sweet dreams.
  And to you.
  God bless you (Greeting).
  Good luck.
  Safe journey.
  Give me.
  Where are you going?
  What is your name?
  My name is Luckong.
  Whose child are you?
  I am Lukong's child.
  Who is the traditional ruler of Nso?
  I am hungry.
  I am thirsty.
  I love you.
  Marry me.
  Where are you going?

Animal names 

 : leopard
 : dog
 : monkey
 : elephant
 : lion
 : duiker
 : goat
 : sheep
 : buffalo
 : squirrel
 : serpent
 : cricket
 : spider
 : tarantula
 : hyena
 : chicken
 : he-goat
 : lizard
 : bat

Other nouns 

 : sun
 : water
 : book
 : pineapple
 : house
 : roof
 : floor
 : door
 : chair
 : rug
 : cooking pot
 : (typically a small bowl)
 : cup
 : basket
 : farm
 : firewood
 : pepper
 : spoon
 : junction
 : house of worship (church)
 : vehicle
 : rice
 : roof
 : file
 : Irish potato
 : sweet potato
 : cocoyam
 : banana
 : meat
 : walking stick
 : mom (mother)
 : dad (father)
 : sister (relative)
 : brother (relative)
 : relative (A general sense. Example: * : I am your relative)

Adjectives 
 : hot
  : cold
 : Heavy.
 : Dark.
 : White
 : Bitter.
 : Sweet.

References

Bibliography
 
 McGarrity, Laura and Botne, Robert (2001). Between Agreement and Case Marking in Lamnso. IUWPL 3: Explorations in African Linguistics: From Lamnso' to Sesotho (2001), edited by Robert Botne and Rose Vondrasek, pp. 53–70. Bloomington, IN: Noun classes and categorization: Proceedings of a symposium on categorization and noun classification, Eugene, Oregon, October 1983''. Amsterdam: J. Benjamins.

Ring languages
Languages of Cameroon